Madusanka is a Sinhalese name that may refer to the following people:
 
Surname
Amila Madusanka (born 1992), Sri Lankan cricketer
Malka Madusanka (born 1995), Sri Lankan cricketer
Pathum Madusanka (born 1996), Sri Lankan cricketer

See also

Madushanka (disambiguation)

Sinhalese surnames